John Francis "Jackie" Goode (16 February 1924 – 15 December 1986) was an Irish hurler who played as a left corner-back for the Waterford senior team.

Born in Dungarvan, County Waterford, Goode first played competitive hurling in his youth. He subsequently became a regular member of the starting fifteen of the Waterford senior team and won one All-Ireland medal and one Munster medal.

As a member of the Munster inter-provincial on a number of occasions Goode won five Railway Cup medals. At club level he was a five-time championship medallist as a Gaelic footballer with Dungarvan.

Goode retired from inter-county hurling following the conclusion of the 1954 championship.

Honours

Team

Dungarvan
Waterford Senior Football Championship (5): 1945, 1946, 1947, 1948, 1954

Waterford
All-Ireland Senior Hurling Championship (1): 1948
Munster Senior Hurling Championship (1): 1948

Munster
Railway Cup (5): 1948, 1949, 1951, 1952, 1953

References

1924 births
1986 deaths
Dungarvan hurlers
Dungarvan Gaelic footballers
Waterford inter-county hurlers
Munster inter-provincial hurlers
All-Ireland Senior Hurling Championship winners